40 chansons d'or is a double-CD by Charles Aznavour, released in 1994 on EMI Records. It was reissued in 1996 with a different track listing.

Track list of the 1994 edition 

CD 1

Au creux de mon épaule (1989 version)
Sa jeunesse (1989 version)
Si je n'avais plus (1989 version)
Le Palais de nos chimères (1989 version)
Une enfant (1989 version)
À ma fille
Non je n'ai rien oublié
La Bohème
Les Deux Guitares
Comme ils disent
Désormais
Bon anniversaire
Il te suffisait que je t'aime
Pour faire une jam (1989 version)
Les Comédiens
La Mamma
Emmenez-moi
Trousse-Chemise
Donne tes seize ans
Tu t'laisses aller

CD 2

Sur ma vie (1989 version)
J'en déduis que je t'aime (1989 version)
Parce que (1989 version)
Je m'voyais déjà
Que C'est Triste Venise
Il faut savoir
L'amour c'est comme un jour
Et pourtant
Hier encore
Paris au mois d'août
Après l'amour (1989 version)
Qui?
Le Temps
For Me Formidable
Avec
Plus bleu que tes yeux (1989 version)
Ce sacré piano (1989 version)
Les Plaisirs démodés
Mourir d'aimer
Et moi dans mon coin

Track list of the 1996 edition 

CD 1

Au creux de mon épaule
Sa jeunesse
Toi et moi
Le Palais de nos chimères
Mes emmerdes
À ma fille
Non je n'ai rien oublié
La Bohème
Les Deux Guitares
Comme ils disent
Désormais
Bon anniversaire
Il te suffisait que je t'aime
Pour faire une jam
Les Comédiens
La Mamma
Emmenez-moi
Trousse chemise
Donne tes seize ans
Tu t'laisses aller

CD 2

Sur ma vie
J'en déduis que je t'aime
Parce que
Je m'voyais déjà
Que c'est triste Venise
Il faut savoir
L'amour c'est comme un jour
Et pourtant
Hier encore
Paris au mois d'août
Après l'amour
Qui?
Le Temps
For Me Formidable
Avec
Plus bleu que tes yeux
L'Amour et la Guerre
Les Plaisirs démodés
Mourir d'aimer
Jezebel

References

1996 greatest hits albums
EMI Records compilation albums